Buffalo gun may refer to:

A rifle used for hunting American buffalo (bison)
Hawken rifle, a muzzle-loading rifle from the earlier period of American western expansion
Buffalo rifle, a later, often breechloading cartridge rifle during the period of commercial buffalo hunting
A rifle used for hunting African Cape buffalo
Heavy calibre bolt action rifle
Heavy calibre double rifle
 Buffalo Gun (film), a 1961 American western film